<onlyinclude>The list of Nintendo 64 games includes  licensed releases spanning from the platform's launch in 1996 to the final release in 2002. The Nintendo 64 home video game console's library of games were primarily released in a plastic ROM cartridge called the Game Pak. This strategic choice of high-performance but lower-capacity medium was met with some controversy compared to CD-ROM. Two small indentations on the back of each cartridge allows it to connect or pass through the system's cartridge dustcover flaps. All regions have the same connectors, and region-locked cartridges will fit into the other regions' systems by using a cartridge converter or by simply removing the cartridge's casing. However, the systems are also equipped with lockout chips that will only allow them to play their appropriate games. Both Japanese and North American systems have the same NTSC lockout, and Europe has a PAL lockout. A bypass device such as the N64 Passport or the Datel Action Replay can be used to play import games, but a few require an additional boot code.

The Nintendo 64 was first launched in Japan on June 23, 1996, with Super Mario 64, Pilotwings 64, and Saikyō Habu Shōgi; in North America with Super Mario 64 and Pilotwings 64; and in Europe with Super Mario 64, Pilotwings 64, Star Wars: Shadows of the Empire, and Turok: Dinosaur Hunter. The final licensed game to be published for the system is the North American-locked Tony Hawk's Pro Skater 3 on August 20, 2002. The final first-party games are Dr. Mario 64 on April 8, 2001, in North America, and Dōbutsu no Mori six days later in Japan. The best-selling game is Super Mario 64 with 11 million units . The total unit sales of Nintendo 64 software has exceeded the total unit sales of GameCube software, but it has the lowest software sales per console sold among all Nintendo consoles.

This list is initially organized by either the game's English language title, or the Hepburn romanization of Japan-only releases. All English titles are listed first, followed by alternate titles, and there are no unofficial translations. Games for the 64DD peripheral and the Aleck 64 arcade system are not included in this list.

Regions

 In Brazil, there were 135 games released through Gradiente/Playtronic, including an NTSC version of F1 Racing Championship never released in North America.

Nintendo 64 games
There are currently  games on this list.

Unreleased games

Notes

References

64 Games
Nintendo 64